Waucedah Township is a civil township of Dickinson County in the U.S. state of Michigan.  The population was 809 at the 2020 census.

Communities

Geography
According to the United States Census Bureau, the township has a total area of 90.0 square miles (233.2 km), of which, 88.9 square miles (230.4 km) of it is land and 1.1 square miles (2.8 km) of it (1.21%) is water.

Demographics
As of the census of 2000, there were 800 people, 325 households, and 233 families residing in the township.  The population density was 9.0 per square mile (3.5/km).  There were 628 housing units at an average density of 7.1 per square mile (2.7/km).  The racial makeup of the township was 98.75% White, 0.12% African American, 0.12% Native American, 0.12% Asian, and 0.88% from two or more races. Hispanic or Latino of any race were 0.62% of the population. 20.6% were of German, 20.0% Italian, 8.8% French, 7.8% Belgian, 7.6% Polish, 5.4% French Canadian, 5.4% Irish and 5.2% Swedish ancestry according to Census 2000.

There were 325 households, out of which 32.0% had children under the age of 18 living with them, 62.2% were married couples living together, 6.8% had a female householder with no husband present, and 28.3% were non-families. 24.6% of all households were made up of individuals, and 9.8% had someone living alone who was 65 years of age or older.  The average household size was 2.46 and the average family size was 2.95.

In the township the population was spread out, with 24.1% under the age of 18, 5.6% from 18 to 24, 28.9% from 25 to 44, 28.8% from 45 to 64, and 12.6% who were 65 years of age or older.  The median age was 41 years. For every 100 females, there were 103.0 males.  For every 100 females age 18 and over, there were 99.7 males.

The median income for a household in the township was $40,400, and the median income for a family was $43,472. Males had a median income of $36,154 versus $20,833 for females. The per capita income for the township was $17,706.  About 3.9% of families and 6.0% of the population were below the poverty line, including 4.9% of those under age 18 and 3.4% of those age 65 or over.

References

Townships in Dickinson County, Michigan
Iron Mountain micropolitan area
Townships in Michigan